"Dead from the Waist Down" is a song by Welsh rock band Catatonia, taken from their third studio album, Equally Cursed and Blessed. It was written by Mark Roberts with Catatonia and produced by the band and TommyD. Released on 29 March 1999, the song reached number seven on the UK Singles Chart and was the band's only song to chart in New Zealand, where it peaked at number 44.

Recording and release
The first version of "Dead from the Waist Down" was recorded by Mark Roberts of Catatonia on a DPS12 hard disk recorder, while the band was on an American tour. It featured Roberts playing a guitar, as well as rough ideas for the chorus. He had written the song about being on tour in Los Angeles, and having members of the band's entourage who weren't enjoying themselves. It was combined with singer Cerys Matthews' idea to develop a song suitable for BBC Radio 2 and her mother. It was then recorded for the Equally Cursed and Blessed album at Monnow Valley Studios in Rockfield, Monmouthshire, Wales.

Track listings
UK, European, and Australian CD single
 "Dead from the Waist Down" – 3:51
 "Branding a Mountain" – 1:56
 "Bad Bad Boy" – 2:46

UK 7-inch and cassette single
 "Dead from the Waist Down" – 3:51 (3:40 on 7-inch)
 "Branding a Mountain" – 1:56

Credits and personnel
Credits are lifted from the Equally Cursed and Blessed album booklet.

Studios
 Recorded at Monnow Valley Studios (Rockfield, Wales)
 Mixed at Whitfield Street Studios (London, England)

Personnel
 Catatonia – writing, production
 Mark Roberts – writing
 TommyD – production, mixing
 Joe Gibb – engineering
 Roland Herrington – mixing

Charts

References

1999 singles
1999 songs
Blanco y Negro Records singles
Catatonia (band) songs
Songs written by Cerys Matthews
Songs written by Mark Roberts (singer)